The Southern States Wrestling (SSW) Young Guns Television Championship is a secondary professional wrestling championship in Southern States Wrestling. It was first won by Mike Cooper in Kingsport, Tennessee on August 10, 2000. The title is generally defended in the Southern United States, most often in its home base in East Tennessee, but has been defended in other parts of the region as well. There are 8 recognized known teams with a total of 12 title reigns.

Title history

References

External links
Official Tag Team Championship Title History
  SSW Young Guns Television Championship
Regional professional wrestling championships